SKK Prievidza Dolphins, is an amateur Korfball club from Prievidza, Slovakia. The club is one of the two existing Slovakian korfball clubs and has around 40 members.

Squad (Current)

Player / Head coach    

   Marcel Kavala

External links
Prievidza Dolphins website
Slovakia Korfball

Korfball teams
Sports clubs established in 1990
Sports teams in Slovakia
Korfball in Slovakia